Washukanni (also spelled Waššukanni) was the capital of the Hurrian kingdom of Mitanni, from around 1500 BC to the 13th century BC.

Location
The precise location of Waššukanni is unknown. A proposal by Dietrich Opitz located it under the largely unexcavated mound of Tell el Fakhariya, near Tell Halaf in Syria. This position was supported by M. Oppenheim and more recently by others. A neutron activation comparison with clay from relevant Amarna tablets appeared to rule out Tell Fakhariya. This idea was also rejected by Edward Lipinski. However, this identification received a new support by Stefano de Martino, Mirko Novák and Dominik Bonatz due to recent archaeological excavations by a German team. This is counterbalanced by the fact that despite many seasons of excavations over the years no documentation of the name of the Mittani capital has yet been found.

History
Waššukanni is known to have been sacked by the Hittites under Suppiluliuma I (reigned c. 1344–1322 BC) in the first years of his reign, whose treaty inscription relates that he installed a Hurrian vassal king, Shattiwaza. The city was sacked again by the Assyrian king Adad-nirari I around 1290 BC, but very little else is known of its history.

Legacy
The modern-day Waşokanî refugee camp, built near Hesekê in the Autonomous Administration of North and East Syria to house inhabitants of Serê Kaniyê and Zirgan who had been displaced by the 2019 Turkish offensive into north-eastern Syria, is named after Waššukanni.

See also
 Mitanni
 Cities of the ancient Near East

References

Hurrian cities
Bronze Age sites in Syria
Lost ancient cities and towns